Alberta Provincial Highway No. 986, commonly referred to as Highway 986, is an east-west highway in Northern Alberta.

Highway 986 comprises the western segment of the partially constructed "Northern Alberta East-West Highway Corridor".

Route description 
After intersecting Highway 743, the highway crosses the Peace River and enters Northern Sunrise County. A short distance later, the highway intersects Highway 688.

History 
Highway 986 was originally numbered Highway 686. The highway was renumbered in the mid-1990s.

Major intersections 
The following is a list of major intersections along Highway 986 from west to east.

References 

986